Sakalakothapalle is a village in Eluru district of the Indian state of Andhra Pradesh. It is located in Pedapadu mandal of Eluru revenue division.

Demographics 

 Census of India, Sakalakothapalle had a population of 772. The total population constitute, 402  males and 370 females with a sex ratio of 920 females per 1000 males. 65 children are in the age group of 0–6 years with sex ratio of 970. The average literacy rate stands at 70.30%.

References 

Villages in Eluru district